Bundamba State Secondary College (formerly Bundamba State High School) is a public secondary school in the Ipswich suburb of Bundamba, Queensland, Australia. It was established in 1970 and named after its situated suburb of Bundamba.

It is known for its multiculturalism and is close to the Ipswich Racecourse, Bundamba railway station, The Bremer Institute of TAFE and the Ipswich Motorway.

History 
The school was established in 1970 as Bundamba State High School (BSHS) and adopted its present name in 2002.

Notable alumni 
Rhan Hooper, Australian Rules Football player.
Shayne Neumann, member of the Australian Parliament for Blair.

See also 
 List of schools in Queensland

References 

Public high schools in Queensland
Schools in Ipswich, Queensland
Educational institutions established in 1970
1970 establishments in Australia
Bundamba, Queensland